Lawrence Edward Roberts Sr. (December 9, 1922 – October 12, 2004) was a pilot with the Tuskegee Airmen and a colonel in the United States Air Force, with 32 years of total military service. He is the father of newscaster Robin René Roberts and Sally-Ann Roberts .

Personal life
Roberts was born on December 9, 1922, in the Vauxhall section of Union Township, Union County, New Jersey. He was married to Lucimarian Tolliver for 57 years. They had four children: Lawrence E. Roberts, Jr., Sally-Ann Roberts, Dorothy Roberts McEwen Ricketts,   and Robin René Roberts. He taught his children to live their lives without limitations. Roberts was an active member of the First Presbyterian Church in Bay St. Louis, Mississippi.

Roberts attended Howard University, received his bachelor's from Morningside College, and received his master's degree from the Tuskegee Institute.

Military service
Roberts entered the United States Army Air Corps at Keesler Air Force Base in 1943. He was assigned to the Tuskegee Airmen program in 1944. Roberts flew Piper Cubs, North American B-25 Mitchell bombers, Douglas C-54 Skymaster transports and North American F-86 Sabre fighter jets. Roberts also served as an instructor in Tuskegee University's Air Force ROTC program from 1958 to 1960.

He served in the Vietnam War and received 18 service medals and awards.

Later life
Roberts was one of the founding members of the Keesler Air Force Base Gospel Service, the oldest Gospel service in the United States Air Force. The only Mississippi chapter of the Tuskegee Airmen Club was named in his honor. On October 12, 2004, Roberts died at his home in Biloxi, Mississippi, at the age of 81 of a heart attack. He was buried with full military honors. Services were held at the Triangle Chapel at Keesler Air Force Base near Biloxi and he was buried at Biloxi National Cemetery.

Since his death, Roberts posthumously received awards throughout the country. In 2004, shortly after he died, the Mississippi Legislature drafted a resolution honoring his life and on March 29, 2007, he posthumously received the Congressional Gold Medal. President George W. Bush honored Roberts with the Congressional Gold Medal for bravery, patriotism and helping persuade President Harry S. Truman to desegregate armed forces. In March 2009, a sculpture by Marlin Miller was dedicated in War Memorial Park in Pass Christian, Mississippi. On September 10, 2009, a new consolidated aircraft maintenance facility for the 403rd Wing at Keesler AFB was dedicated and named in Roberts's honor.

His daughter Robin Roberts executive produced and narrated the one-hour documentary Tuskegee Airmen: Legacy of Courage for History, which premiered on 10 February 2021.

See also
 Dogfights (TV series)
 Executive Order 9981
 Freeman Field Mutiny
 List of Tuskegee Airmen
 Military history of African Americans
 The Tuskegee Airmen (movie)

Notes

External links

1922 births
2004 deaths
Congressional Gold Medal recipients
People from Union Township, Union County, New Jersey
People from Bay St. Louis, Mississippi
Howard University alumni
Morningside University alumni
Tuskegee University alumni
Tuskegee Airmen
United States Air Force colonels
United States Army Air Forces pilots of World War II
United States Army Air Forces officers
Recipients of the Legion of Merit
African-American aviators
Aviators from New Jersey
21st-century African-American people
Military personnel from New Jersey